A Star rigger is a person in author Jeffrey Carver's Star Rigger universe books who pilots a spacecraft through the hyperspace realm known as "the Flux."

Riggers
Ships can be piloted by a solo rigger, or several riggers working as a team. Riggers must be very creative people, since navigating the Flux requires much imagination. In the Star Rigger books, it is suggested that riggers can "burn out", spending so much time in the Flux that they begin to live in their own dream world. Legends say that some become vaguely translucent, having seemingly left a part of themselves in the Flux. 

Riggers are members of the RiggerGuild, which protects them from exploitation and grants them certain rights. For example, a planet's Spacing Authority must provide all possible assistance and transportation to a ship's rigger crew and passengers from the point of first possible contact in the event of a FluxSpace accident. If the RiggerGuild is not satisfied that its members are being treated appropriately, it can call a general strike, paralyzing a planet's interstellar economy.  

The first known rigger was Panglor Balef, in the Twelfth Century of Space.

Navigating the Flux
Riggers must navigate space by visualizing the intangible features of the Flux as an interactive landscape and adapting their flight patterns to the landscape. Although no two riggers will experience the same space in exactly the same way, a team of riggers must work together to create a shared vision of the Flux in order to successfully navigate their ship. The Flux has treacherous areas that can entrap a ship, manifesting themselves as whirlpools and eddies, or the more dangerous quantum flaws. Tales exist among the riggers of strange visions of dragons and ghost ships within the Flux.

Notes

Fictional technology